Dariusz Karłowicz (born 1964) is a Polish philosopher, university lecturer, columnist, and a book publisher.
The president of the St. Nicolas Foundation (Fundacja Świętego Mikołaja) which is an NGO involved in charitable, educational, and scientific activity.
An Editor-in-chief of the Polish philosophical magazine "Political Theology" ("Teologia Polityczna") which analyzes the connections and relationships between philosophy, religion, and politics.
Lecturer in political philosophy at the War Studies University in Warsaw.
Co-author of a weekly television program "Trzeci Punkt Widzenia" on the channel TVP Kultura (on the public television).
A regular columnist in the weekly Sieci (one of the largest weekly magazines in Poland).
A member of the policy council for the magazine First Things – the Polish edition (2006-2008),
The author of books and articles.
The winner of the Andrzej Kijowski Prize for the book "Koniec snu Konstantyna" (2005).
Was awarded by the Order of Polonia Restituta for charity work (2012).

Books translated into English:

 The Archparadox of Death. Martyrdom as a philosophical category, Polish edition published by Znak, Kraków 2000, and by Fronda, Warszawa 2007, English edition published by Peter Lang, Frankfurt 2016.
 Socrates and Other Saints, published by Fronda, Warszawa 2005, English edition published by Cascade Books, Wipf and Stock Publishers, Eugene, Oregon 2017.

References 

1964 births
Cardinal Stefan Wyszyński University in Warsaw alumni
Living people
21st-century Polish philosophers